Stephen Kenny may refer to:
Stephen Kenny (lawyer), Guantanamo detainee David Hicks' original lawyer
Stephen Kenny (football manager) (born 1971), Irish football manager

See also
Steve Kenney (born 1955), American football player